Moncure Robinson (February 2, 1802 – November 10, 1891) was an American civil engineer, railroad planner and builder and a railroad and steamboat owner, who is considered one of America's leading Antebellum period civil engineers. He was educated at the College of William and Mary and at the Sorbonne; his most noted project was the Philadelphia & Reading Railroad.

Unlike many early 19th century American engineers, Robinson did not receive his engineering education at the United States Military Academy at West Point, New York. He acquired his engineering education through self-directed study and observing engineering projects throughout the United States and Europe. Within nine years of the introduction of the first steam locomotive in the United States, Robinson surveyed, supervised the construction, or was the consulting engineer for 721 miles of track (or one-third the entire railroad track built to that time). At the time of his death in 1891, over 163,000 miles of track spanned the country.

Along with well-known engineers Benjamin Henry Latrobe, II, John Edgar Thomson, and John B. Jervis, Moncure Robinson was in much demand during the late 1820s-40s and after, the transition period from America's Canal Era to the beginning of the Railway Age. By 1850, the basic technical aspects of the American railroad had been solved by this generation of engineers.

Early life 
Moncure Robinson was born in Richmond, Virginia to Agnes Conway Moncure (1780 – November 15, 1862), whose husband, John Robinson III (February 13, 1773 – April 26, 1850), was clerk and later judge of the circuit court. Both parents were from the First Families of Virginia. His brother Conway Robinson would serve a term in the Virginia House of Delegates, but become more noted as a legal scholar and historian, as well as for establishing parks and public buildings during his time on Richmond's City Council.

The Robinson family presence in Virginia dates to 1688 at New Charles Parish. His mother's father, Peyton Conway, was the clerk of the court in Stafford County, Virginia, and her family also descended from Scots immigrant—Rev. John Moncure (1709-1764), longtime priest of Aquia parish and friend of founding fathers George Washington, George Mason and others. His brothers were Cary, Edwin, Conway, Eustace and Moore Robinson, sisters Octavia (c. 1813 – c. 1880) and Cornelia.

Education and apprenticeship 
Moncure Robinson attended the College of William and Mary from 1815 to 1818. He did not graduate, because in 1818 the College asked him and 21 other students to leave in a dispute involving the charges for a lecture class. Although later exonerated, Robinson never returned to the school, nor fulfilled his father's expectation to follow his example and become an attorney, (though his cousin, Richard C.L. Moncure long served as President of the Court of Appeals). Robinson studied drafting in New York, and visited the Erie Canal then under construction. Knowing that Virginians contemplated similar canal building, Robinson applied for a position with the Board of Public Works to survey a route from Richmond to the Ohio River.

Personal life 
Robinson married Charlotte Randolph Taylor (1815–1895) on February 2, 1835. Likewise a member of the First Families of Virginia, her grandfather Edmund Randolph was the nation's first attorney general, and numerous other Randolphs likewise distinguished (even President Thomas Jefferson could trace Randolph family descent). Their sons were John Moncure Robinson (1835-1893) and Edmund Randolph Robinson; their unmarried daughter Natalie Robinson lived at home in 1880. The family lived in Philadelphia, Pennsylvania beginning in 1835, although the traveling Moncure Robinson only lived there intermittently until his death. They also had a residence in Richmond, Virginia.

Early surveys 

Although denied a job because of his youth, the enthusiastic 16-year-old Robinson was allowed to accompany the surveyors as a volunteer. On returning to Virginia, Robinson worked as an engineer's assistant with the James River Company, apprenticing on survey work for canals in his native state. He then continued his education in Europe, where he witnessed and learned from some of the world's first railroad operations. Three years later, the Virginia Board of Public Works hired Robinson to assist in locating an extension for the James River Canal. Robinson traveled to New York to view the construction of the Erie Canal, over a less hilly route than contemplated in Virginia. That visit convinced him of the advantages of railroads over canals both as a means of transportation and in commerce. His report to the Virginia Board of Public Works disputed the benefits of further canal development, and praised railroads in its place. Faced with an unenthusiastic response, Robinson resigned his position and, at that moment, devoted himself to developing railroads.

Robinson then traveled to Europe and further studied civil engineering at the Ecole des Ponts et Chaussees, Sorbonne, in Paris from 1825 to 1827. Touring Europe, Robinson also studied canal, harbor, bridge and railroad engineering in England, the Netherlands, France and Italy.

Railroad construction 

In 1828-1829, Pennsylvania hired Robinson to survey parts of the state's anthracite coal regions, the upper Susquehanna River canal system, and the Danville and Pottsville Railroad (D & P) connecting the upper Susquehanna and Schuylkill rivers' canal systems with the coal fields in between. Moncure Robinson remained an early advocate of railroads over canals, and came to direct construction of several of the earliest railroads in the country, including parts of the D & P railroad and inclines during the early 1830s.

In 1829, Pennsylvania's "Main Line of Public Works" hired Robinson to survey part of the canal and railroad route from Philadelphia to Pittsburgh. His best known early work was the survey and design of the Allegheny Portage Railroad, the 36 mile combination of ten inclines and level railroad over the Allegheny Mountains, Hollidaysburg to Johnstown, which connected the state's canal on the east side with another state-subsidized canal in the Ohio River drainage on the west. The survey included the first railroad tunnel to be built in the United States, and became an engineering landmark. Modeled after early British practices, some called it one of the greatest accomplishments of the Canal Era.

Robinson also surveyed lines in the Mahanoy and Shamokin coal lands, eventually acquiring a part of the lands.  He was civil engineer for the Little Schuylkill Railroad, 1830-1831, and for what would become the Catawissa Railroad in the anthracite country (all later part of the Reading). All had inclines and connected to canals—still within the early British tradition of railroads being an adjunct to water/canal transport systems. While building one of the short coal railroads of the anthracite region, Robinson also served as post master of Port Clinton, Pennsylvania, where an early home of his still stands. He also promoted the use of trains to carry mail.

Back in his native Virginia, Robinson built the Chesterfield Railroad, a thirteen-mile coal road with incline, the first railroad in Virginia, completed in 1831. Robinson also directed construction of other short lines around Richmond: Richmond & Petersburg, Richmond, Fredericksburg & Potomac (which his brother Conway Robinson serving as President), and Winchester & Potomac. In 1833, at age 31, Robinson became chief engineer for a grand railroad project from Richmond through Lynchburg, and later the New River Gorge, and on to the Ohio River. Although Robinson completed a survey, backers of the existing (though troubled and incomplete) James River Canal blocked public funding for the company, so it could not to enough raise funds for construction, although decades later the Chesapeake & Ohio Railroad built the route.

Meanwhile, Robinson returned to Pennsylvania. In 1833, he was elected to the American Philosophical Society. In 1833-1834, he also surveyed a railroad in the Tamaqua coal fields, directed further D & P construction in the Shamokin Valley, and another built another coal line near Pottsville. During 1834-1840, Robinson became chief engineer of the new Philadelphia and Reading Railroad and directed construction of the line, including a spectacular stone bridge and a tunnel 1,932 feet long now considered his crowning achievements. The 93-mile railroad built from the major anthracite coal fields of Pottsville to Reading and then to the connecting railroads and port at Philadelphia was the first double track mainline in the United States (after the British model). The route included three of the nine first railroad tunnels in the United States, and was reportedly the first to use crushed stone ballast. (In 1828-9, Robinson had designed his first railroads—the Allegheny Portage and the Danville & Pottsville railroads—as double track lines, but these included inclines that worked better with two tracks; the Reading was the first main line designed at the outset with double tracks in mind, though with only a 22' wide grade that required widening later).  Because of the extensive coal fields it tapped, the Reading would become one of the most profitable railroads in the U. S. It was also considered Moncure Robinson's first mountain railroad without inclines—a statement about the transition from the Canal Era of feeder coal roads to water transport/canals. The Reading paralleled the Schuylkill Canal, and by the 1840s proved the superiority of the railroad over the turnpikes and canals; railroads thus became the 19th century's inland transportation system.

Horses and mules, gravity and stationary steam engines on inclines, were the first motive power on Moncure Robinson's railroads. Though Robinson held patents on incline systems, from the beginning, he recommended British built locomotives for railroads, especially the recently perfected 0-4-0s with Bury fire box. By the mid-1830s, American mechanics had perfected the 4-2-0, with its lead swivel truck or pilot wheels – designed by John B Jervis for the Mohawk & Hudson – and Robinson recommended these for steeper grade railroads during the late 1830s, in Virginia and Pennsylvania. For the Reading, he ordered British and American made locomotives. For more power, however, he helped design in 1839 one of the earliest 4-4-0 locomotives, the "Gowan & Marx," named after his London banker. The most powerful locomotive up to that time was built by Eastwick & Harrison of Philadelphia, and proved ideal for the coal fields tapped by the Reading.

In 1840, Robinson declined an offer from the Czar of Russia to direct an ambitious railroad building program, but did serve as consultant to the Czar, the US government, and elsewhere. About this time he broadened his consulting work, providing reports on the proposed New York & Erie Railroad, the New York Harbor improvements, and other projects. In 1839, with Benjamin Latrobe, John Jervis, J Edgar Thomson, Claudius Crozet, Horatio Allen, Henry Campbell (and others), Robinson helped organize the American Society of Civil Engineers in Philadelphia. When the organization languished, Robinson helped form a new American Society of Civil Engineers in New York in 1852, and the following year the new organization bestowed one of its highest honors on Robinson by electing him an honorary member. Robinson was described as "tall and handsome ... with cold, gray eyes, an aquiline nose, and a scar on the left side of his face that ran from the corner of his mouth to his ear.  Women found him fascinating."

While working on the Reading, Robinson undertook other railroad projects. He built the majestic bridge across the James River between Manchester and Richmond, Virginia for the Richmond and Petersburg Railroad which was  completed in 1838. This 19-span bridge was the most impressive Town lattice truss bridge ever built in wood.  Because of increased business in Virginia, he left his cousin Wirt Robinson as the Reading's chief engineer. Between 1840 and 1847, Moncure Robinson succeeded his brother Conway (and an interim president) as president of the Richmond, Fredericksburg and Potomac Railroad and continued his interest in the line afterward (another brother Edwin Robinson succeeded him as president 1847-1860, and his son John became the line's president 1871-1878). Moncure Robinson also continued to advocate for a line from Richmond to the Ohio River, which would compete with the Baltimore and Ohio (Latrobe chief engineer), Pennsylvania (Thomson chief engineer, later president), and the series of lines paralleling the Erie Canal later organized as the New York Central (Jervis chief engineer), all of which built into the Ohio Valley/Midwest in the 1840s-50s.

Manager and financier 
By the late 1840s Robinson was moving away from civil engineering, and toward management and finance. After successfully raising funds in England for the Reading railroad in the 1830s, he more and more turned to financing and directing project. Robinson became an active stockholder and/or director of various rail and water transport companies—the Seaboard & Roanoke Railroad, the Chesapeake & Delaware Canal, Chester Valley Railroad, Pennsylvania Railroad, Philadelphia, Wilmington & Baltimore Railroad, steamboats on the Chesapeake, and other properties—managing his holdings from his Philadelphia home.

During the American Civil War, his son John Moncure Robinson was president of the Seaboard and Roanoke Railroad and took pride in substituting Southern products for supplies normally purchased in the North (such as bacon grease for whale oil, and even manufacturing its own soap). However, military needs led the Confederate Secretary of War to order key railroad supplies such as iron to be sent to other locations, and even ordered the destruction of both Norfolk & Petersburg and Seaboard & Roanoke railroad track to patch other lines, especially the line from Petersburg to Weldon, North Carolina (previously a competitor). Federal troops seized one locomotive, and other rolling stock leased to other railroads. In May 1863 Union troops captured a bridge near Carrsville, Virginia and sent salvaged track to Norfolk, as well as narrowed the (5 foot wide) S&R line between Suffolk and Kilbey, so it could be operated as part of the U.S. Military Railroad. Meanwhile, following the example of his cousins (Conway Robinson's sons), Moncure Robinson's son John M. Robinson accepted a commission as a Confederate captain and in 1863 served as an engineering officer under General Sam Jones in southwestern Virginia. He also ran the Union blockade and became a special purchasing agent in Europe for five Virginia railroads and the Confederate government. As commander of Company B of the 38th North Carolina Infantry, J.M. Robinson would attend General Robert E. Lee during the surrender at Appomattox Court House. He would later become President of the Richmond, Fredericksburg & Potomac Railroad, but resigned in a bitter dispute with his father over curtailment of steamboat service on the Potomac River (although the two would reconcile at the end of both their lives). Captain Robinson would become president of the Baltimore Steam Packet Company (a/k/a Bay Line) as well as the S&R railroad, and develop rail-water service between Baltimore, Portsmouth, Raleigh, Hamlet, Abbeville and Atlanta.

After the War, Moncure Robinson, his son John Moncure Robinson, former Confederate general William Mahone and North Carolina businessman Alexander Boyd Andrews successfully worked with investors to consolidate a series of short-line railroads into what became the Seaboard Air Line Railroad and ship system. They foiled an attempt by Thomas A. Scott, who had risen through the ranks of the Pennsylvania Railroad and acquired the Chesapeake and Ohio Railroad after the war, to build a system along the eastern seaboard. Instead, John Moncure Robinson became superintendent then president of this major,  southern trunk line, from Norfolk and Richmond, Virginia to Atlanta, Georgia and Birmingham, Alabama. Even during the Panic of 1873 (which destroyed Mahone's empire and much of the fledgling Republican party in Virginia) the Seaboard Road showed a profit and declared regular annual dividends.

In 1887, at age 85, Moncure Robinson completed his last railroad construction project, the 18-mile Palmetto Railroad in the Carolinas, which helped link the Seaboard line from Richmond to Florida.

Death and legacy 

Robinson died on November 10, 1891 in Philadelphia and was interred at Laurel Hill Cemetery. He had survived his brother Conway Robinson by seven years (although Conway's body would be returned to Richmond for burial). Moncure Robinson's widow survived him by four years; their son and railroadman John M. Robinson reconciled with his father in their last years but only survived him by two years. Eulogists remembered that as a young man, Moncure Robinson had been one of the new Republic's first railroad civil engineers. Robinson wrote his will on September 11, 1873 (months before Conway's death), and left an endowment for preservation of the Aquia Episcopal Church, Aquia, Virginia (his grandfather was reverend there, and his parents and many cousins of various degrees of descent are buried there—the Robinson trust still funds the cemetery's maintenance). His personal papers and the papers of the Robinson family are held by the Special Collections Research Center at the College of William and Mary.

Reputation 
Robinson became the leading railroad engineer in the United States, attained an international reputation for engineering excellence and executive talent, and during his retirement continued to consult on various railroad projects. Called "one of the most distinguished civil engineers in the United States" and the "genius of America's earliest railways," Robinson was instrumental in the early development and growth of the country's great railroad system. He influenced Frederick List, called the "Father of German Railroads" and Michel Chevalier, the Minister of Public Works under Louis Philippe and the most eminent engineer in France.

Publications 
 Francis William Rawle, Moncure Robinson. Central Rail Road: Reports of the Engineers of the Danville and Pottsville Rail Road Company ; with the Report of the Committee of the Board Thereon, October 15, 1831. Danville and Pottsville Rail Road Company. Clark & Raser, 1831
 Moncure Robinson. Report on the Continuation of the Little Schuylkill Rail Road: From Port Clinton to Reading. J. and W. Kite, printers, 1834
 Moncure Robinson, Jonathan Knight, Benjamin Hall Wright. Report of M. Robinson ... Jonathan Knight ... and Benjamin Wright ... Civil Engineers, upon the plan of the New-York and Erie Rail Road. Scott & Company, 1835
 Moncure Robinson. Report of Moncure Robinson, Esq: Upon the Surveys for the Louisa Rail Road, Volume 38. T.W. White, 1836.
 Moncure Robinson. Obituary Notice of Henry Seybert. 1883

References

Further reading 
 Barbara E. Benson (ed.) Benjamin Henry Latrobe and Moncure Robinson: The Engineer as Agent of Technological Transfer. Proceedings Regional Conference in Economic History, Eleutherian Mills, 1974. 
 Revelle W. Brown. The Reading Railroad – An Early History. The Newcomen Society of England, American Branch, New York, 1946.
 Revelle W. Brown. Moncure Robinson, Genius of America's Earliest Railways. The Newcomen Society of England, American Branch, New York, 1949.
 George H. Burgess and Miles C. Kennedy. Centennial History of the Pennsylvania Railroad Company, 1846-1946. Philadelphia: Pennsylvania Railroad, 1949.
 James D. Dilts. The Great Road, the Building of the Baltimore and Ohio, the Nation's First Railroad, 1828-1853. Stanford, California: Stanford University Press, 1993.
 Richard B Osborne, "Professional Biography of Moncure Robinson," William & Mary Quarterly, 2d Series, vol 1 #4, October 1921. 
 Scott Nelson Reynolds.  Iron Confederacies: Southern Railways, Klan Violence, and Reconstruction.  University of North Carolina Press, 2000.

External links 

 Robinson, Moncure (1802-1891) at Swem Library Special Collections, The College of William & Mary Robinson.

1802 births
1891 deaths
19th-century American railroad executives
Burials at Laurel Hill Cemetery (Philadelphia)
Businesspeople from Richmond, Virginia
Moncure family